Patrick B. Byrne (born March 8, 1956, in London, England) is an American Thoroughbred racehorse trainer who has won three Breeders' Cup races and who in 1997 conditioned Favorite Trick to American Champion Two-Year-Old Colt and American Horse of the Year honors and Countess Diana to American Champion Two-Year-Old Filly honors.

A native of London, England, Byrne was from a family involved in horse racing. He rode horses in Europe before emigrating to the United States in 1978 where he worked in New York as an exercise rider. He then spent eight years learning the training business from trainers such as LeRoy Jolley, John Russell, Howard Tesher and David Whitely before taking out his trainers license in 1986.

In 1998, Patrick Byrne trained Awesome Again to an undefeated year that was capped off with a win in the Breeders' Cup Classic.

Byrne makes his home in Louisville, Kentucky, where he settled in 1990, competing from a base at Churchill Downs.

References

1956 births
Living people
American racehorse trainers
Sportspeople from London
Horse trainers from Louisville, Kentucky